German submarine U-461 was a Type XIV supply and replenishment U-boat ("Milchkuh") of Nazi Germany's Kriegsmarine during World War II.

Her keel was laid down on 9 December 1940, by Deutsche Werke in Kiel as yard number 292. She was launched on 8 November 1941 and commissioned on 30 January 1942 with Oberleutnant zur See Hinrich-Oscar Bernbeck in command. Bernbeck was promoted to Kapitänleutnant by 21 April 1942, when he was relieved by Korvettenkapitän Wolf-Harro Stiebler.

Design
German Type XIV submarines were shortened versions of the Type IXDs they were based on. U-461 had a displacement of  when at the surface and  while submerged. She had two shafts and two propellers.

U-461 was not fitted with torpedo tubes or deck guns, but had two  SK C/30 anti-aircraft guns with 2500 rounds as well as a  C/30 guns with 3000 rounds. The boat had a complement of fifty-three.

Operational career
U-461 conducted six patrols. As a supply boat, she avoided combat.

First and second patrols
U-461s first patrol took her from Kiel to St. Nazaire in occupied France, via the gap between Iceland and the Faeroe Islands and out into the mid-Atlantic.

Her second patrol was much like her first; the most westerly point in the Atlantic was reached on 30 September 1942.

Third and fourth patrols
U-461s third sortie commenced with her departure from St. Nazaire on 19 November 1942. Travelling south, she reached the furthest spot in the patrol which was roughly between South America and Africa. There, she spent two days (according to her position reports), before moving a short distance west on 11 December 1942. She returned to her French base on 3 January 1943.

She steamed to a point west of the Canary Islands, which she reached on 2 March 1943. Having departed St. Nazaire on 13 February, she returned there for the last time on 22 March.

Fifth patrol
She left St.Nazaire on 20 April 1943, but was attacked on the return leg on 23 April by a Canadian Wellington of 172 squadron RAF, equipped with a Leigh Light. Three bombs were dropped, resulting in slight damage and, more seriously, a trail of oil. She returned to France, but this time to Bordeaux.

Sixth patrol and loss
She had left Bordeaux on 27 July 1943, but was hardly out of the Bay of Biscay, north-west of Cape Ortegal, Spain, when she was sunk on 30 July by an Australian Sunderland flying boat from No. 461 Squadron RAAF piloted by Flight Lieutenant Dudley Marrows. Coincidentally this aircraft had the registration "U", also making it known as 'U-461'. As a result of the attack, all 12 Australian crew on the flying boat agreed to drop an inflatable dinghy, fifteen of her crew survived; 53 were killed.

Wolfpacks
U-461 took part in three wolfpacks, namely:
 Wolf (26 July – 1 August 1942) 
 Vorwärts (16 – 20 September 1942) 
 Rochen (26 February – 1 March 1943)

References

Bibliography

External links

 

German Type XIV submarines
U-boats commissioned in 1942
U-boats sunk in 1943
World War II submarines of Germany
Shipwrecks in the Bay of Biscay
1941 ships
World War II shipwrecks in the Atlantic Ocean
Ships built in Kiel
U-boats sunk by Australian aircraft
Maritime incidents in July 1943